John Thomas Ball (13 September 1907 – 1976) was an English footballer, who played as a forward. Born in Banks, Lancashire, he played for clubs including Southport, Manchester United, Sheffield Wednesday, Huddersfield Town and Luton Town.

He joined Mossley from Newtown United in 1925, scoring 10 goals in 18 appearances, including a debut hat-trick in a 5–1 win over Macclesfield on 31 October 1925, before moving to Southport for the 1926–27 season. He then moved to Chorley before in 1929 moving to Manchester United.

He moved from Manchester United to Sheffield Wednesday in the summer of 1930, and made his Wednesday debut on 8 September. He played in Sheffield Wednesday's 2–1 defeat by Arsenal in the Charity Shield at Stamford Bridge in October 1930. Ball scored 94 goals in just 135 matches with the Sheffield club, before returning to Manchester United in December 1933. In September 1934, he moved to Huddersfield Town, but he moved on to Luton Town after only a month.

He had a short spell in France as a coach with Excelsior Roubaix after his playing career was finished and briefly managed St Albans City and Biggleswade Town after the Second World War.

References

1907 births
1976 deaths
Footballers from Southport
English footballers
Association football forwards
English Football League players
Manchester United F.C. players
Huddersfield Town A.F.C. players
Luton Town F.C. players
Sheffield Wednesday F.C. players
Southport F.C. players
Mossley A.F.C. players
Chorley F.C. players
St Albans City F.C. managers